Rolands Štrobinders (born 14 April 1992) is a Latvian athlete specialising in the javelin throw. He competed at the 2015 World Championships in Beijing without qualifying for the final.

His personal best in the event is 85.07 metres set in Bad Köstritz in 2017.

Competition record

Seasonal bests by year

2010 – 68.88
2011 – 75.71
2012 – 81.20
2013 – 81.68
2014 – 83.10
2015 – 83.37
2016 – 81.76
2017 – 85.07

References

Latvian male javelin throwers
Living people
Place of birth missing (living people)
1992 births
World Athletics Championships athletes for Latvia
Athletes (track and field) at the 2016 Summer Olympics
Olympic athletes of Latvia